The year 1926 was marked, in science fiction, by the following events.

Births and deaths

Births 
 February 20 – Richard Matheson, American writer (died 2013)
 March 19 – Jimmy Guieu, French writer (died 2000)
 March 29 – Lino Aldani, Italian writer (died 2009)
 April 1 – Anne McCaffrey, American writer (died 2011)
 May 9 – John Middleton Murry, Jr., British writer (died 2002)
 August 9 – Frank M. Robinson, American writer (died 2014)
 November 25 – Poul Anderson, American writer (died 2001)

Deaths

Events 
 April – first publication of Amazing Stories, which ran until 1995 (and again from 1998–2000, 2004–2005 and 2012–present)

Awards 
The main science-fiction Awards known at the present time did not exist at this time.

Literary releases

Novels 
 Metropolis, by Thea von Harbou
 The Land of Mist, by Arthur Conan Doyle
 (in Russian) The Lord of the World, by Alexander Belayev

Stories collections

Short stories 
  The Coming of the Ice, by Green Peyton Wertenbaker

Comics

Audiovisual outputs

Movies

See also 
 1926 in science
 1925 in science fiction
 1927 in science fiction

References

Science fiction by year

science-fiction